Atrevido y Diferente (Daring and Different) is the debut studio album by Puerto Rican salsa singer Eddie Santiago. Released in 1986, it was cited as one of the turning points of the salsa genre into salsa romantica.

Singles
Two singles were released from the album that charted on the Hot Latin Tracks.

Nadie Mejor Que Tu (Nobody Better Than You) was the first single released from the album and charted #16 on Hot Latin Tracks.
Que Locura de Enamorarme de Ti (What Madness to Fall in love with you) was the second single released from the album and charted #13 on the Hot Latin  Tracks.

Track listing
"Tú Me Quemas" - 4:59
"Volcán de Amor" - 4:22
"Nadie Mejor Que Tú" - 3:49
"De Profesión... Tu Amante" - 4:28
"Que Locura Enamorarme de Ti" - 5:07
"Secretos" - 4:17
"Quiero Amarte en la Yerba" - 5:06
"Se Acabó" - 4:00

Chart position
The album peaked #1 on the tropical album charts and remained #1 for 10 consecutive weeks.

Reception

John Storm Roberts of Allmusic declared Atrevido y Diferente to be "the biggest name in the newish salsa-romantica vein" and pointed out the rise of salsa romantica.

See also
List of number-one Billboard Tropical Albums from the 1980s

References

1986 albums
Eddie Santiago albums
Rodven Records albums